The 1966 Hobart Carnival was the 16th edition of the Australian National Football Carnival, an Australian football interstate competition. It was the final time that Tasmania hosted a carnival.

It was competed by two Victorian sides, one from the Victorian Football League (VFL) and another from the Victorian Football Association (VFA), as well as South Australia, Western Australia and the home state Tasmania.

The VFL topped the ladder as the only undefeated team and Peter Hudson was the leading goal-kicker with 20 goals.

Squads

Victoria (VFL)

WA

SA

TAS

Victoria (VFA)

Results: Opening Day
Match One (Thursday, 9 June 1966) 
 Western Australia: 3.10 (28) | 11.12 (78) | 20.14 (134) | 26.18 (174)
 Victoria (VFA): 1.0 (6) | 2.2 (14) | 4.5 (29) | 5.11 (41)
Attendance: 20,047 at North Hobart Oval (Double header)

Match Two (Thursday, 9 June 1966) 
 Victoria (VFL): 5.6 (36) | 12.13 (85) | 21.21 (147) | 26.24 (180)
 Tasmania: 4.1 (25) | 7.2 (44) | 10.4 (64) | 11.13 (79)
Attendance: 20,047 at North Hobart Oval (Double header)

Results: Day Two
Match Three (Saturday, 11 June 1966) 
 Victoria (VFL): 1.7 (13) | 5.13 (43) | 11.17 (83) | 16.23 (119)
 South Australia: 1.1 (7) | 2.2 (14) | 3.7 (25) | 7.9 (51)
Attendance: 23,764 at North Hobart Oval (Double header)

Match Four (Saturday, 11 June 1966) 
 Tasmania: 4.6 (30) | 6.13 (49) | 13.22 (100) | 19.27 (141)
 Victoria (VFA): 3.1 (19) | 4.3 (27) | 5.5 (35) | 7.11 (53)
Attendance: 23,764 at North Hobart Oval (Double header) *Ground Record

Results: Day Three
Match Five (Monday, 13 June 1966) 
 Victoria (VFL): 3.3 (21) | 7.7 (49) | 12.12 (84) | 14.17 (101)
 Victoria (VFA:) 1.2 (8) | 3.3 (21) | 6.6 (42) | 9.7 (61)
Attendance: 13,969 at North Hobart Oval (Double header)

Match Six (Monday, 13 June 1966) 
 Western Australia: 1.3 (9) | 4.5 (29) | 7.7 (49) | 13.11 (89)
 South Australia: 2.4 (16) | 4.9 (33) | 8.13 (61) | 10.14 (74)
Attendance: 13,969 at North Hobart Oval (Double header)

Results: Day Four
Match Seven (Thursday, 16 June 1966) 
 Western Australia: 3.6 (24) | 8.8 (56) | 15.12 (102) | 17.13 (115)
 Tasmania: 5.2 (32) | 11.4 (70) | 13.8 (86) | 16.10 (106)
Attendance: 10,199 at North Hobart Oval (Double header)

Match Eight (Thursday, 16 June 1966) 
 South Australia: 6.4 (40) | 8.8 (56) | 14.13 (97) | 21.20 (146)
 Victoria (VFA): 3.2 (20) | 5.7 (37) | 8.10 (58) | 9.11 (65)
Attendance: 10,199 at North Hobart Oval (Double header)

Results: Final Day
Match Nine (Saturday, 18 June 1966) 
 South Australia: 3.0 (18) | 7.3 (45) | 11.5 (71) | 14.7 (91)
 Tasmania: 1.3 (9) | 2.7 (19) | 4.9 (33) | 9.13 (67)
Attendance: 23,368 at North Hobart Oval (Double header)

Match Ten (Saturday, 18 June 1966) 
 Victoria (VFL): 4.4 (28) | 6.5 (41) | 10.8 (68) | 15.10 (100)
 Western Australia: 5.1 (31) | 9.3 (57) | 11.3 (69) | 13.7 (85)
Attendance: 23,368 at North Hobart Oval (Double header)

All-Australian team
In 1966 the All-Australian team was picked based on the Hobart Carnival.

Tassie Medal
Western Australian Barry Cable won the Tassie Medal on eight votes, two clear of runner up John Goold.

References
1966 Hobart Carnival page on Full Points Footy

Australian rules interstate football
Hobart Carnival, 1966